Marc Diamond is an American lead guitarist best known for his work with seminal hardcore band Dwarves (under the pseudonym The Fresh Prince of Darkness) as well as the Los Angeles hard rock outfit Motochrist. He previously played in the bands Texas Terri Bomb, and Mondo Generator (featuring fellow Dwarves bassist Rex Everything). His work has been featured in both TV and film, and has appeared on myriad recordings by other artists.

Discography
Full-length LPs / CDs:
 Broken Glass, A Fast Mean Game" - Chrysalis Records, 1990
 NY Loose, Year of the Rat - Hollywood Records, 1996
 Motochrist, 666 Pack - RAFR Records, 1999
 Gage, Sore Eyes and a Rusty Heart - Dr. Wu Records, 2000
 The Dwarves, Come Clean - Epitaph Records, 2000
 The Dwarves, How to Win Friends and Influence People - Reptilian Records, 2001
 Torrance Jackson, My Dream - Dr. Wu Records, 2001
 Motochrist, Greetings from the Bonneville Salt Flats - Heat Slick Records, 2003
 Mondo Generator, A Drug Problem That Never Existed - Ipecac Recordings, 2003
 The Dwarves, The Dwarves Must Die - Sympathy for the Record Industry, 2004
 The Holograms, Night of 1000 Ex-Boyfriends Teenacide Records, 2005
 Motochrist, Hollywood High - Dr. Wu Records, 2006
 Faster Pussycat, The Power and the Gloryhole Full Effect Records, 2006
 Mondo Generator, Dead Planet:Sonic Slow Motion Trails - Mother Tongue, 2006
 Texas Terri Bomb, Your Lips...My Ass! TKO Records, 2004
 Hollywood Roses, Dopesnake - Cleopatra/Deadline Music, 2007
 The Dwarves/Blag Dahlia, No Balls Records Germany, 2007
 Candy Now!, MVD Records, 2009
 Motochrist, Corvette Summer - Dr. Wu Records, 2010
 The Dwarves, The Dwarves Are Born Again - MVD/Greedy, 2011
 The Dwarves,  European 10 - NO Balls Records, 2011
 Mondo Generator, Hell Come To Your Heart EP - No Balls Records, 2011
 Nick Oliveri's Uncontrollable, Leave Me Alone - Schnitzel Records, 2014

Singles/45s:
 Blister, "Hey Louie/Automatic" - Snag Free Records, 1995
 The Apes, "Hypnosis" - Low Blow Records, 1996
 NY Loose, "Rip Me Up/Detonater" - Hollywood Records, 1996
 NY Loose/Hole, "Spit/Gold Dust Woman" - The Crow soundtrack, Hollywood Records, 1996
 The Dwarves, "Way Out/How It's Done/There She Goes Again" - Recess Records, 2000
 Texas Terri /Marky Ramone, "Dirty Action/Love Hates Me" - Rawk a Hula Records,  2002
 Texas Terri/Antiseen , "Dirty Action/Beat on the Brat" -TKO Records, 2003
  Dwarves, "Salt Lake City/Go!/Kaotica" - Sympathy for the Record Industry, 2004
  Dwarves, "Like You Want/Another Classic/Astroboy" Sympathy for the Record Industry, 2004
 The Dwarves/Turbo AC's, "Bleed On/Turbonaut" - No Balls Records, 2005
 Mondo Generator, "I Never Sleep/Here We Come/Allen's Wrench" - Mother Tongue, 2006
 Ayumi Hamasaki, "Talkin' 2 Myself/Decision" - Columbia Japan, 2007
 Dwarves/Royce Cracker, "Speed Demon" - Zodiac Killer Records, 2009
 Dwarves, "Fake ID" - Zodiac Killer Records, 2011
 Dwarves, "We Only Came To Get High" - Riot Style, 2011
 Dwarves, "Stillborn in the USA" -Asian Man Records/Greedy, 2012

References
	

Living people
American punk rock guitarists
Mondo Generator members
Dwarves (band) members
Year of birth missing (living people)